The Omni La Costa Resort & Spa is a luxury destination resort hotel opened in 1965, located in Carlsbad, California, and is owned by Omni Hotels & Resorts, based out of Dallas, Texas. The resort is located in the San Diego area hills and is known for its golf courses and hosts professional golf and tennis tournaments. Tournaments at La Costa were hosted starting in the late 1960s, including many PGA Tour events and tennis events such as the Southern California Open. Currently the resort is home to events such as World Team Tennis and the California State Amateur Championship. Omni La Costa Resort & Spa is a member of Historic Hotels of America, the official program of the National Trust for Historic Preservation, and has hosted the La Costa Film Festival.

History
The resort was founded in the early 1960s when a real estate developer, Irwin Molasky, from Las Vegas discovered an equestrian ranch in the coastal foothills of Southern California. Originally conceived as a residential resort offering activities and instruction for all ages, the resort opened on July 10, 1965 with 40 units available to guests for $22 per night which included green fees, as well as access to tennis, horse stables and the pool.

Professional golf
La Costa served as a home to two notable PGA Tour events.  For thirty years, the resort hosted the Mercedes Championships (originally called the Tournament of Champions), from 1969 to 1998.  That event left for Maui, Hawaii, when La Costa was selected to host the inaugural WGC-Accenture Match Play Championship in 1999. It hosted that event for seven of eight years (the 2001 event was played in Australia), until it moved to Arizona in 2007.  In 2010 and 2012, the resort hosted the Kia Classic, an LPGA tour event with an estimated attendance of 43,000 in 2010.

Penthouse article lawsuit
In March 1975, Penthouse published an article headlined "La Costa: The Hundred-Million-Dollar Resort with Criminal Clientele," written by Jeff Gerth and Lowell Bergman.  The article indicated that the La Costa Resort and Spa in Carlsbad was developed by Mervyn Adelson and Irwin Molasky using loans from the Teamsters Pension Fund and that the resort was a playground for organized crime figures.  The owners, along with two officials of the resort, Morris B. "Moe" Dalitz and Allard Roen, filed a libel lawsuit for $522 million against the magazine and the writers. In 1982, a jury absolved the magazine of any liability against the lawsuit from the owners.  The plaintiffs appealed, but in December 1985, before a new trial could begin, the two sides settled.  Penthouse issued a statement that they did not mean to imply that Adelson and Molaskey are or were members of organized crime.  In turn the plaintiffs issued a statement lauding Penthouse publisher Bob Guccione and his magazine for their "personal and professional awards."  Total litigation costs were estimated to exceed $20 million. According to the  San Diego Reader, Merv Adelson finally admitted to mob ties in an interview published in the March 2013 issue of Vanity Fair magazine.

Connection to other controversies
On May 8, 2007, WXYZ-TV in Detroit, Michigan, reported that now convicted and deposed mayor of Detroit, Kwame Kilpatrick used $8,600 from a fund created for voter education, economic empowerment, and crime prevention, to take his family and a babysitter on a week-long vacation to the La Costa Resort and Spa.
Tax and accounting experts found Kilpatrick's use of the fund also violated IRS regulations.

Ownership timeline
1965-1987: Mervyn Adelson and Irwin Molasky 
1987-2001: Sports Shinko 
2001-2007: KSL Resorts
2007-2010: Whitehall Street Real Estate Funds
2010-2013: KSL Capital Partners
2013–Present: Omni Hotels & Resorts

References

External links
La Costa Resort and Spa Wikimapia

Hotels in California
Resorts in California
Carlsbad, California
Golf clubs and courses in California
Swimming venues in California
Tennis venues in California
World TeamTennis stadiums
1965 establishments in California
Hotels established in 1965